Jannaram is a populated major village in Enkoor Mandal, with an area of 20.88 km2.

Economy

Jannaram is a major economic power in the Enkoor revenue division. Jannaram has solid fertile soil and irrigation is supported by the river of Wyra and Nagarjuna Sagar left canal. Jannaram has experienced a modest growth during the period of Chandra Babu Naidu ruling. As a major village in Enkoor, Jannaram is politically very active, sociologically dominant, agriculturally rich. Major source of income comes from Agriculture and other services. There is no commercial industry located in Jannaram. Jannaram produces almost all of the cotton, paddy, mrichi and all other commercial and cereals in Enkoor. Jannaram is a large paddy producer in Enkoor.

Demography of Jannaram
As of the 2011 Indian census, Jannaram had a population of 3,900. Males constitute 51% of the population and females 49%. Jannaram has an average literacy rate of 78.50%, greater than the Mandal average. In Jannaram, 10% of the population are under 6 years of age. Most of well educated people well settled in towns and most of people in different high positions in different places.

References

Villages in Khammam district